The Australian Department of Broadband, Communications and the Digital Economy is a former department of the Government of Australia that was charged with the responsibility to help develop a vibrant, sustainable and internationally competitive broadband, broadcasting and communications sector and, through this, promote the digital economy for the benefit of all Australians.

The department was formed in 2007 and dissolved in 2013. Its functions were assumed by the newly created Department of Communications.

Operational functions
In the Administrative Arrangements Order of 3 December 2007, the functions of the department were broadly classified into the following matters: 
Broadband policy and programs
Postal and telecommunications policies and programs
Spectrum policy management
Broadcasting policy
National policy issues relating to the digital economy
Content policy relating to the information economy

Department programs
 The Higher Bandwidth Incentive Scheme (HiBIS) was a strategy which ran from 2004 to 2007 to provide registered Internet service providers with incentive payments to supply higher bandwidth services in regional, rural and remote areas at prices comparable to those available in metropolitan areas.
 The Australia Connected package was announced on 18 June 2007. Up to $958 million ($600 million from Broadband Connect Infrastructure Program funding and an additional $358 million in funding) was allocated towards a new national wholesale network which was stated to deliver high speed broadband to rural and regional Australia by June 2009.

References

Broadband, Communications and the Digital Economy
Ministries established in 2007
2013 disestablishments in Australia
2007 establishments in Australia